Yan Meizhu (born 28 January 1989) is a Chinese handball player. Playing on the Chinese national team, she competed at the 2008 Summer Olympics in Beijing, where China placed sixth.

References

External links

1989 births
Living people
Sportspeople from Shanxi
Chinese female handball players
Olympic handball players of China
Handball players at the 2008 Summer Olympics
Asian Games medalists in handball
Handball players at the 2010 Asian Games
Asian Games gold medalists for China
Medalists at the 2010 Asian Games
21st-century Chinese women